Kampalapura is a village in Mysore district of Karnataka state in India.

Location
Kampalapura is located between Mysuru and Madikeri cities at latitude 12.335401 and longitude 76.158353. It is also sometimes referred to as Kamplapura.

Villages and suburbs
Periyapatna. 7 km
Kushalnagar 28 km
Bettadapura 22 km
Ramanathapura 40 km
Saligrama 38.5 km
Hunasuru 16 km
Gonikoppa 34 km
Virajpete 50 km

Demographics
The population of Kampalapura village is 4,721, and there were 1,112 families identified in the last census.

Economy 
The economy of the village is mostly agrarian. The major crops are tobacco, ragi, maize, areca nut and rice.

Educational organisations 
 Government Primary School, Kamplapura.
 Government Urdu Primary School,
 Government High School, 
 Sri Naga vidya sametha.
 MR Noble English medium school.

Post office
There is a post office in the village and the pin-code is 571107.

Image gallery

References

Villages in Mysore district